Opel Arena may refer to:

 Opel Arena (van), a light commercial van sold from 1997 until 2001
 Opel Arena (stadium), a multi-purpose stadium in Mainz, Germany